ISR International School on the Rhine is a private school that started operation in 2003 in the heart of the Neuss/Düsseldorf area, in the Western part of central Germany. The county of Neuss, the city of Neuss, the Neuss Chamber of Commerce and local and international companies in the region joined to establish an international college preparatory school.

When it first opened 2003, the school had 65 students. , enrolment has risen to over 1000 students representing 52 different countries, including China, Germany, the United Kingdom, Japan, the Netherlands, India, Russia, South Korea, Taiwan, Turkey, and the United States.

The school offers a full-day academic program to students from Kindergarten through Grade 12 and is accredidated by the state of North Rhine-Westphalia.

The following leaving certificates are offered: SABIS® High School Diploma, IGCSE, Advanced Placement and International Baccalaureate (IB).

In 2018, ISR took over the neighboring Stadtwald district sports facility as the leaseholder. This increased the total size of the campus site to 110,000 m2.

In addition to the kindergarten on the Neuss campus, another ISR kindergarten opened in Düsseldorf-Niederkassel at the end of 2019.

In January 2020, it was announced that ISR would take over the Rhine Island Nonnenwerth along with the affiliated high school on August 1, 2020.

Notable alumni 
Liu Yangyang - Taiwanese rapper and singer; member of K-pop boy group NCT and its Chinese sub-unit WayV

References

Sources 
http://www.internationale-schule.de
https://www.isr-school.de/
https://www.sabis.net/

Private schools in Germany
International schools in Germany
International Baccalaureate schools in Germany
International schools in North Rhine–Westphalia